Truman Howe Bartlett (1835–1922), also known as T. H. Bartlett, was an American sculptor, and father to sculptor Paul Wayland Bartlett.

Bartlett was born in Dorset, Vermont, studied under Robert Eberhard Launitz in New York City and subsequently in Paris, Rome, and Perugia. He was active in New Haven, Waterbury, and Hartford, Connecticut, and in New York City. For 22 years he was an instructor at the Massachusetts Institute of Technology's architecture department, and also operated a free art school for poor children. He died in Boston, Massachusetts.

Bartlett ran the only school for sculpture in Boston in that late 1800s. It was located at 616 Washington Street and later moved to 394  Federal Street. Cyrus Dallin studied with Bartlett from 1880-1881. Bartlett allowed Dallin to live in his studio rent free when his funding ran low and wrote positively of his talents. The relationship would sour and in 1885 Bartlett would be critical of Dallin's winning first effort in the competition to sculpt Paul Revere.

Bartlett's best known works include The Wounded Drummer Boy of Shiloh, and the Horace Wells Monument (1875) in Bushnell Park, Hartford, Connecticut. Both bronzes were exhibited in Paris. According to Marquis, Bartlett was the first American sculptor to make a figure in terracotta.

References

External links
 Clara Erskine Clement Waters, Laurence Hutton, Artists of the Nineteenth Century and Their Works: A Handbook Containing Two Thousand and Fifty Biographical Sketches, Houghton, Osgood and Company, 1879, page 37.
 Albert Nelson Marquis, Who's who in New England, A.N. Marquis, 1915, page 85.
 Joseph Thomas, Universal Pronouncing Dictionary of Biography and Mythology, Lippincott, 1908, page 297.
 AskArt entry

1835 births
1922 deaths
People from Dorset, Vermont
20th-century American sculptors
20th-century American male artists
19th-century American sculptors
19th-century American male artists
American male sculptors
Artists from Vermont